Brokeback Mountain is a 2005 American epic romantic drama film directed by Ang Lee. Based on the short story of the same name by author Annie Proulx, the story was adapted by Larry McMurtry and Diana Ossana. The film depicts the complex emotional and sexual relationship between two men, Ennis Del Mar and Jack Twist (played by Heath Ledger and Jake Gyllenhaal, respectively) in the American West between 1963 and 1983. Michelle Williams, Anne Hathaway, Linda Cardellini, Randy Quaid, Anna Faris, and Kate Mara feature in supporting roles.

Brokeback Mountain premiered at the Venice International Film Festival, where it won the Golden Lion. Focus Features gave the film a limited release on December 9, 2005 before a wide release on January 13, 2006. The film grossed $178 million worldwide on a production budget of $14 million. Review aggregator Rotten Tomatoes surveyed 234 reviews and judged 87% of them to be positive.

Brokeback Mountain garnered awards and nominations in a variety of categories, including for its directing, screenplay, acting, original score, and cinematography. At the 78th Academy Awards, Brokeback Mountain was nominated for the Academy Award for Best Picture and won three awards for Best Director, Best Adapted Screenplay, and Original Score. The film garnered seven nominations at the 63rd Golden Globe Awards, winning four for Best Motion Picture – Drama, Best Director, Best Song, and Best Screenplay. At the 59th British Academy Film Awards, Brokeback Mountain was nominated for nine awards, winning in the categories of Best Film, Best Direction, Best Adapted Screenplay and Best Supporting Actor for Jake Gyllenhaal. The film also received prizes at various guilds: it won the Producers Guild of America Award for Best Theatrical Motion Picture, the Directors Guild of America Award for Outstanding Directing – Feature Film, and the Writers Guild of America Award for Best Adapted Screenplay. In addition, it garnered four Screen Actors Guild nominations for Best Actor, Best Supporting Actor, Best Supporting Actress and Best Cast, more than any other film; however, it did not win any of these awards.

After Brokeback Mountain lost the Academy Award for Best Picture to Crash, many accused the Academy of homophobia and for making a non-groundbreaking choice, and commentators including Kenneth Turan and Nikki Finke derided the Academy's decision. However, supporters of Crash, such as critic Roger Ebert, argued that claims of bias were unjustified and that the better film won. In 2015, The Hollywood Reporter polled hundreds of Academy members, asking them to re-vote on past controversial decisions. In the poll, Brokeback Mountain won the re-vote for Best Picture.

Accolades

See also 
 2005 in film
 Brokeback Mountain (soundtrack)
 Brokeback Mountain (short story)

Notes

References

External links 
 

Lists of accolades by film
Brokeback Mountain